Fichte is a German-language surname:

Johann Gottlieb Fichte (1762–1814), German philosopher
 Hubert Fichte (1935–1986), German writer
 Immanuel Hermann Fichte (1796–1879), German theologian and philosopher, son of Johann Gottlieb Fichte

See also 

German-language surnames